Elise Maxine Irwin (born 1966) is an Australian politician. She was a Liberal member of the Western Australian Legislative Council for North Metropolitan from 4 April 2017, when she was elected in a countback following the resignation of Peter Katsambanis, to 21 May 2017, when the new Legislative Council elected at the 2017 state election took its seats.

References

1966 births
Living people
Members of the Western Australian Legislative Council
Place of birth missing (living people)
Liberal Party of Australia members of the Parliament of Western Australia
21st-century Australian politicians
21st-century Australian women politicians
Women members of the Western Australian Legislative Council